Feidong County is a county of Anhui Province, East China, it is under the administration of the prefecture-level city of Hefei, the capital of Anhui. It contains 18 towns and 2 development zones.

Administrative divisions
Feidong County is divided to 11 towns, 5 townships and 1 ethnic township.
Towns

Townships

Ethnic Townships
 Paifang Hui and Manchu Ethnic Township

Climate

Transport
China National Highway 312

The urban area is served by Feidong railway station. Changlinhe railway station is also situated here.

Notable people
Bao Zheng (999–1062), Northern Song dynasty bureaucrat and judge whose name has become synonymous with judicial wisdom and uprightness.
Li Hongzhang (1823–1901), prominent late Qing dynasty bureaucrat and diplomat.
Wu Bangguo (1941–), currently chairman of the Standing Committee of the National People's Congress.

References

External links
Official website of Feidong County Government

County-level divisions of Anhui
Hefei
Feidong County